The 2006 Season was the 20th edition of the United Soccer Leagues season.

General
 Miami FC joined the First Division.
 The Richmond Kickers departed the First Division for the Second Division.
 The Northern Virginia Royals departed the Second Division for the Premier Development League (PDL).
 9 new teams joined the PDL while 5 teams folded, for a complete list see here.

Honors

Standings

First Division

Playoffs
Quarterfinals and Semifinals 2-game aggregate 
Higher seeded team hosted first game
Exception: Montreal hosted second game vs Vancouver

Awards and All-League Teams
First Team
F: Romario (Miami FC) (Co-Leading Goalscorer); Cam Weaver (Seattle Sounders) (Co-Leading Goalscorer)
M: Ben Hollingsworth (Charleston Battery); Luke Kreamalmeyer (Portland Timbers); Zinho (Miami FC); Joey Gjertsen (Vancouver Whitecaps) (MVP)
D: Gabriel Gervais (Montreal Impact) (Defender of the Year); Geordie Lyall (Vancouver Whitecaps); Mauricio Segovia (Puerto Rico Islanders); Andrew Gregor (Seattle Sounders)
G: Greg Sutton (Montreal Impact) (Goalkeeper of the Year)
Coach: Michael Anhaeuser (Charleston Battery) (Coach of the Year)

Second Team
F: Alen Marcina (Puerto Rico Islanders); Greg Simmonds (Virginia Beach Mariners)
M: Leonardo Di Lorenzo (Montreal Impact); Jeff Clarke (Vancouver Whitecaps); Rodrigo Rios (Atlanta Silverbacks); Gavin Glinton (Charleston Battery))
D: Nevio Pizzolitto (Montreal Impact); Matt Bobo (Atlanta Silverbacks); Kenney Bertz (Rochester Raging Rhinos); Steve Klein (Vancouver Whitecaps)
G: Scott Vallow (Rochester Raging Rhinos)

Second Division

Playoffs

Premier Development League
See 2006 PDL Season

See also
 United Soccer Leagues

References

External links
 Official USL Site

2
2006
2006
2006 in Canadian soccer